The Fortune of War is the sixth historical novel in the Aubrey-Maturin series by British author Patrick O'Brian, first published in 1979. It is set during the War of 1812.

HMS Leopard made its way to Botany Bay, left its prisoners, and sailed to Pulo Batang where the ship was declared unfit. Captain Aubrey and some of his followers are put aboard La Flèche packet to sail home for a new commission. A shipboard fire ends the months of sweet sailing and brings them into the new war.

The Fortune of War contains lightly fictionalized accounts of two sea battles in the War of 1812.

Plot summary
HMS Leopard sails from Desolation Island to Port Jackson where she drops off her few prisoners. Captain Bligh is already handled, so she proceeds to the Dutch East Indies station and Admiral Drury at Pulo Batang. Leopard is declared unfit for guns due to wood rot, and will probably be a troop transport. Jack Aubrey and his followers are to board the courier ship La Flèche, as his next command, awaits him in England. The rest of the crew is left with Admiral Drury. Maturin learns the success of his scheme to damage French intelligence sources from Wallis, and relays the name of a contact in the Royal Navy, mentioned by Louisa Wogan. They join a cricket game, ended abruptly by the arrival of La Flèche, which also brings mail to them. Captain Yorke visited Sophia Aubrey before leaving England, bringing Jack a personal letter and gifts from her.

Aubrey knew Captain Yorke and Maturin quickly warms to this captain who travels with an extensive library and a piano in his cabin. At Simon's Town, La Flèche learns of war between Britain and America. Aubrey spends this time of sweet sailing teaching the young midshipmen while Maturin is engrossed in dissection of specimens from Desolation Island and New Holland with McLean, the ship's Scottish surgeon, passing their evenings with music. One night in the Atlantic near Brazil a fire breaks out on board and all abandon ship to the small boats.

The watch sees a ship hull-up on the horizon, which Java immediately pursues. Aubrey and others from Leopard man two guns but the fight goes badly when Javas foremast gives way. The American commander makes few mistakes and soon Java strikes its colours. Constitution returns to Boston to refit, having taken part of Java for its own repair, then setting fire to her.  Captain Lambert dies of his wounds ashore in Brazil. Aubrey is shot in his right arm, and too ill to be put ashore. Maturin stays with his patient, and works with Dr. Evans, the amiable ship's surgeon. All of Maturin's collections, except what he noted in his diary by words or drawings, are gone. During the voyage Maturin talks with a French passenger picked up at San Salvador, Pontet-Canet.

In Boston, Aubrey convalesces from his wounds in Dr. Choate's hospital, waiting for the next prisoner exchange. Jahleel Brenton of the US Navy Department questions him, but Aubrey puts him off, realizing now why his exchange is taking so long. Maturin is reacquainted with both Louisa Wogan and Michael Herapath, and then meets their daughter Caroline and Michael's father George. George is a wealthy merchant and a Loyalist in the Revolutionary War whose trade with China is interrupted by the present war. Maturin encounters Diana Villiers, still the mistress of Harry Johnson. He is a wealthy American slave owner from Maryland who is active as a spy for his nation. Johnson visits Aubrey who makes a comment about Maturin that reveals too much to the bluff spy. Maturin suspects that Johnson and Pontet-Canet have turned their attention away from Aubrey, towards him. He asks George Herapath to bring Aubrey a pair of pistols.

Aubrey watches the harbor from his hospital bed. Pontet-Canet tries but fails twice to abduct Maturin in the streets of Boston. After the second try, Maturin meets Diana in the Franchon hotel when Johnson is away with Wogan. While searching Johnson's papers, Maturin kills first Pontet-Canet and then Jean Dubreuil as they come to Johnson's room. Maturin finds that Johnson had intercepted Diana's letter to him. He offers to marry her to solve her problems of citizenship. Diana wants away from Johnson. Maturin sends a note to Aubrey setting up a plan of escape that night. George Herapath allows the two to hide in one of his larger ships. Then Aubrey sails a small fishing boat and he, Maturin and Diana meet the thirty-eight gun frigate, entering the outer harbour on blockade duty and are taken on board by Captain Philip Broke, Aubrey's cousin and childhood friend. Broke writes a challenge to Captain Lawrence, the new commander of the thirty-eight gun  lying in harbour, to fight one-on-one, which never reaches him. Chesapeake comes out in apparent pursuit of Aubrey and engages Shannon. The battle lasts fifteen minutes, until Chesapeake strikes her colours to Shannon. Aubrey leads a gun crew, his right arm tied to his body, while Diana sits in the forepeak and Maturin waits below with the surgeon in this victory for the Royal Navy.

Characters 

See also Recurring characters in the Aubrey–Maturin series

British:
 Jack Aubrey - Former captain of HMS Leopard.
 Stephen Maturin - ship's surgeon, friend to Jack and an intelligence officer.
 Sophia Aubrey - Jack's wife and mother of their three children.
 Diana Villiers - love interest of Stephen and cousin of Sophia, living in Boston with Johnson.
 Barret Bonden - the captain's coxswain.
 Preserved Killick - Aubrey's ever loyal servant.
 Babbington - 1st lieutenant in Leopard.
 Captain Moore - commands the Marines in Leopard.
 Mr Foreshaw - young midshipman on Leopard, killed in the battle aboard Java.
 George Byron, originally a midshipman on HMS Leopard, acting fourth lieutenant after the epidemic. He brings his temporary commission papers with him fleeing the burning ship.
 Faster Doudle - prime seaman on Leopard, played as wicket keeper in the cricket match cut short by arrival of La Flèche
 Admiral Drury - admiral on station at Pulo Batang in the Dutch East Indies.
 Wallis - British intelligence at Pulo Batang, Maturin meets with him.
 Captain Yorke - captain of HMS La Flèche.
 Warner - 1st lieutenant in La Flèche.
 McLean - young Scottish ship's surgeon in La Flèche, also a skilled anatomist.
 Captain Henry Lambert - captain of HMS Java.
 Chads - 1st lieutenant in Java.
 General Hislop - Governor-designate of Bombay aboard Java.
 Captain Philip Broke - captain of Shannon.
 Watt - 1st lieutenant in Shannon, killed in the action.
 Mr Jack - surgeon in Shannon.

American:
 Michael Herapath - Once Maturin's assistant on Leopard, he ran from Desolation Island with Mrs Wogan aboard an American whaler; now living in Boston, studying to be a doctor.
 Mrs Louisa Wogan - an attractive young woman, American spy arrested in England, living with Herapath and their daughter in Boston.
 George Herapath - father of Michael and grandfather of little Caroline, a loyalist in the US Revolutionary War, reconciled to the new country, successful Boston merchant especially in trade with China.
 Otis P. Choate - Doctor in Boston who runs the Asclepia, a small private hospital where Aubrey recuperates.
 Henry (Harry) Johnson - Wealthy American from Maryland travelling with Diana, keeps slaves; much involved with US policy and spying. Last seen by Maturin leaving Diana's house in Alipur (India)
 Evans - surgeon in USS Constitution.
 Commodore Bainbridge - commander of USS Constitution.
 Jahleel Brenton - of the American Navy Department, with the same name as a recent Baronet in the British Royal Navy, Captain Jahleel Brenton. This led to Aubrey believing him a psychiatric patient on his first visit.
 Captain James Lawrence - captain of USS Chesapeake immediately before the ship engaged with Shannon; previously captain of Hornet.

French:
 Jean-Paul Pontet-Canet - tall Frenchman travelling to the United States from San Salvador on USS Constitution; Maturin met him years before near Toulon, during the Peace of Amiens.
 Jean Dubreuil - French spy in Boston, first seen by Maturin in European capitals.

Ships 
British:
HMS Leopard - a 50-gun fourth rate (converted to troop transport)
HMS La Flèche - a 20-gun sixth rate (caught fire and exploded)
HMS Cumberland - a 74-gun third rate
HMS Java - a 38-gun frigate (destroyed in battle, burned and exploded)
HMS Shannon - a 38-gun frigate
 - a 32-gun frigate
HMS Belvidera - a 36-gun frigate
American:
USS Constitution - a 44-gun frigate
USS Chesapeake - a 38-gun frigate
USS President - a 44-gun frigate
USS Congress - a 38-gun frigate

Allusions and references

Allusions/references to history, geography and current science
The two frigate actions including one Royal Navy ship and one US Navy ship are real events in the War of 1812: HMS Java against , and  against  (Capture of USS Chesapeake). The fictional Aubrey and Maturin have roles in both in the novel, as accidental passengers on Java and then as prisoners of war in Boston who make a timely escape. The battle actions are transformed for storytelling effect by O'Brian. The capture of USS Chesapeake is discussed in an 1866 source mentioned in the Author's Note for The Fortune of War. The victories of the respective nations greatly raised the morale of their sailors during the conflict. For the United States, it proved that their ships could hold their own against the British, and for the United Kingdom, it proved that American ships could be just as easily defeated as the French, Dutch and Spanish.

Allusions to literature

In Chapter 7, When Maturin looks upon the two corpses in the bath, he reflects that this is like the end of Titus Andronicus, a play by Shakespeare where corpses pile up as revenge plays out. Then Maturin realizes that his situation is different, as he had had to kill or be killed by these French spies, one of whom had tortured to death two friends of his.

Allusions to other novels in the series

In Chapter 6, Stephen Maturin recalls on "the seventeenth of May" that he has been in love with Diana Villiers for "eight years, nine months and some odd days". He met her in Post Captain, during the Peace of Amiens, 1802-03. Though he seemed to know his strong attraction for her immediately in Post Captain, if the fiction is literal, he did not allow himself to fully admit it until fall of 1804. Initially he considered himself unworthy of her, and not in a position to ask her to marry him, which Sophia Williams had encouraged him to do, knowing her cousin's feelings.

The American Captain Lawrence is brought to meet Aubrey in hospital in Boston, in Chapter 7, to bring greetings from Lieutenant Mowett, himself recovering in hospital in New York. Mowett was injured when  was taken by  under Lawrence's command. Mowett had been a midshipman and poet in Master and Commander; Maturin recites some of Mowett's lines of original poetry. He was a favorite to both Aubrey and Maturin.

In Chapter 4, Maturin recalls first seeing Pontet-Canet at a restaurant above Toulon when he and Aubrey visited French naval captain and friend Christie-Pallière after leaving England during the Peace of Amiens, in Post Captain. Maturin detected that Pontet-Canet had a different regional French accent then, compared to what he affected in this visit to America.

Quotations

The changing nature of the connection between the Americans and the British Royal Navy is captured in Aubrey's expressions of gratitude to Michael Herapath for his help in their escape from the French spies, out to a Royal Navy ship in Boston harbor. The American Herapath had served as assistant to Maturin on the Leopard.

"Jack looked long and hard. 'At high water,' he said, 'I shall go into her and run out on the ebb. Will you not come with us, Herapath? I will rate you midshipman in any ship I command, and you could be the Doctor's assistant again. Things might be unpleasant for you in Boston.' 'Oh no, sir,' said Herapath. 'That would never do: though I am obliged to you for your care of me. I have ties here. . . and then, you know, we are enemies.'
'By God, so we are. I had forgot. I find it difficult to think of you as an enemy, Herapath.'" (Chapter 8)

Reviews
This book is sharply different from its immediate predecessors in the series, as it tells of escape and shipwreck, the intensity of intrigue during war rather than battles at sea, though much happens at sea.

Jack doesn’t command a ship in this book, how about that! This is a book with a wrecked ship, a long distance open boat voyage with thirst and cannibalism, two naval battles, lots of exciting spy stuff, and a desperate escape. But it’s utterly different from the previous volumes, which have all been genre sea stories in a way this just isn’t. We were comparing this series with Hornblower earlier—it’s impossible to imagine a Hornblower volume like this. ... I very much like the whole intrigue with Johnson and the French and Stephen—it’s as exciting as the sea chases, but in a very different way. There’s a lot of very good Stephen in this volume—and some wonderful Jack malopropisms.

Publication history
1979, UK, Collins hardback First edition 
1980, May UK, Fontana paperback 
1980, UK, Collins hardback 
1991 W. W. Norton & Company Paperback First USA edition 
1992, William A. Thomas Braille Bookstore Hardcover edition
1992, Books on Tape; Audio edition 
1994, W. W. Norton & Company Hardcover edition 
2001, Thorndike Press Hardcover Large-print edition 
2001, Thorndike Press Paperback Large-print edition 
Recorded Books, LLC; Unabridged Audio edition narrated by Patrick Tull 
2011, W. W. Norton & Company e-book edition 

This novel was first published by Collins in the UK. There was no US publisher until W W Norton issued a reprint 12 years after the initial publication as part of its reissue in paperback of all the novels in the series prior to 1991.

The process of reissuing the novels initially published prior to 1991 was in full swing in 1991, as the whole series gained a new and wider audience, as Mark Howowitz describes in writing about The Nutmeg of Consolation, the fourteenth novel in the series and initially published in 1991.

Two of my favorite friends are fictitious characters; they live in more than a dozen volumes always near at hand. Their names are Jack Aubrey and Stephen Maturin, and their creator is a 77-year-old novelist named Patrick O'Brian, whose 14 books about them have been continuously in print in England since the first, "Master and Commander," was published in 1970.

O'Brian's British fans include T. J. Binyon, Iris Murdoch, A. S. Byatt, Timothy Mo and the late Mary Renault, but, until recently, this splendid saga of two serving officers in the British Royal Navy during the Napoleonic Wars was unavailable in this country, apart from the first few installments which went immediately out of print. Last year, however, W. W. Norton decided to reissue the series in its entirety, and so far nine of the 14 have appeared here, including the most recent chapter, The Nutmeg of Consolation.

References

External links
Maps for The Fortune of War
 

1979 British novels
War of 1812 books
Fiction set in 1812
Aubrey–Maturin series
William Collins, Sons books